John Kevin Duffy (13 April 1897 – 5 November 1977) was an Australian rules footballer who played with St Kilda in the Victorian Football League (VFL).

Duffy, a forward was recruited from Rochester in the Rochester and District Football Association in 1920 to play in the last match of the season against Fitzroy.   

Duffy played with the South Bendigo Football Club in 1921  and most likely played in their 1921 Bendigo Football League premiership.

Notes

External links 

1897 births
1977 deaths
Australian rules footballers from Victoria (Australia)
St Kilda Football Club players